Exechonellidae is a family of bryozoans belonging to the order Cheilostomatida.

Genera

Genera:
 Anarthropora Smitt, 1868
 Anexechona Osburn, 1950
 ''Enantiosula'

References

Cheilostomatida